The Eugene Feenberg Memorial Medal (also Feenberg Award) is a prize for quantum many-body theory named for American physicist Eugene Feenberg. It has been awarded at the International Conference on recent progress in many-body theory since 1985 by an international advisory committee to the conference.

Recipients 

 1985: David Pines
 1987: John W. Clark
 1989: Malvin H. Kalos
 1991: Walter Kohn
 1994: David M. Ceperly
 1997: Lev Pitaevskii
 1999: Anthony James Leggett
 2001: Philippe Nozieres
 2004: Spartak Belyaev, Lev Gor'kov
 2005: Raymond F. Bishop, Hermann Kümmel
 2007: Stefano Fantoni, Eckhard Krotscheck
 2009: John Dirk Walecka
 2011: Gordon Baym, Leonid Keldysch
 2013: Patrick A. Lee, Douglas Scalapino
 2015: Christopher Pethick
 2017: Jordi Boronat
 2019: Steven R. White
 2022: Antoine Georges, Gabriel Kotliar, Dieter Vollhardt

Weblinks 

 Feenberg Medal in Recent Progress in Many-Body Theories Wiki

Physics awards
Awards established in 1983